Time and Again: The Ultimate A-ha is a greatest hits album by Norwegian band A-ha. It was released on 18 March 2016 by Rhino Records. The album spawned three singles: "Cry Wolf" (Jellybean mix), "Did Anyone Approach You?" (reamped) and "You Are the One" (dub mix edit).

Track listing

Charts

References

2016 greatest hits albums
A-ha albums
Rhino Entertainment compilation albums
Albums produced by Alan Tarney